Monstera amargalensis is a flowering plant that belongs to the genus Monstera, and the family Araceae.

Distribution 
Its native range is Colombia (Chocó).

References 

amargalensis
Plants described in 2004
Flora of Colombia